is a Japanese freestyle wrestler. His younger sister is 2021 World Wrestling Championships gold medalist Akari Fujinami.

He won bronze medals at the 2017 World Championships and 2018 Asian Games. He missed the 2018 World Championships due to an injury.

He took up wrestling aged eight at the wrestling gym of his father, Toshikazu Fujinami, a wrestling coach and a former wrestler. He has a degree in law from the Yamanashi Gakuin University.

References

External links
 

1996 births
Living people
Japanese male sport wrestlers
Wrestlers at the 2018 Asian Games
Medalists at the 2018 Asian Games
Asian Games medalists in wrestling
Asian Games bronze medalists for Japan
World Wrestling Championships medalists
21st-century Japanese people